Parliamentary elections were held in Cape Verde on 18 April 2021.

Background 
The incumbent prime minister, Ulisses Correia e Silva of the Christian democratic Movement for Democracy (MpD) party, sought reelection after five years of government. His main contender was Janira Hopffer Almada, of the moderate socialist African Party for the Independence of Cape Verde (PAICV), who would become the first woman to reach the office of Prime Minister if elected.

The two parties have been the dominant political forces in Cape Verde since its democratization, but several newer parties are taking part in the election.

Electoral system
The 72 members of the National Assembly are elected from 16 multi-member constituencies ranging in size from 2 to 15 seats. The elections are held using closed list proportional representation, with seats allocated using the d'Hondt method.

Results

References

Cape Verde
2021 in Cape Verde
Elections in Cape Verde